In sports (especially in North America), a three-peat is winning three consecutive championships. The term, a portmanteau of the words three and repeat, originated with the Los Angeles Lakers of the National Basketball Association, during their unsuccessful campaign for a third consecutive championship during the 1988–89 season, having won the previous 2 NBA Finals.  The Lakers, however, were swept by the Detroit Pistons in the 1989 NBA Finals. The term is a registered trademark owned by Pat Riley, the Lakers' head coach from 1981–1990, although it was coined by L.A. player Byron Scott immediately after their successful championship defense against the Pistons in the 1988 NBA Finals. The Lakers finally achieved a three-peat over a decade later, winning the NBA title in 2000, 2001, and 2002. It was their second in franchise history, and only the first since moving from Minneapolis. As of 2022, the Lakers are the last team of the 4 major American professional sports (NHL, MLB, NFL, & NBA) to accomplish the three-peat.

While originating in the United States, the three-peat has been replicated all over the world across different sports. In recent times, Spanish association football club Real Madrid notably became the first club of the modern era to win three consecutive UEFA Champions League titles (2015–16, 2016–17 and 2017–18).

Origin and trademark
In a comedic context, the same play on words, additionally incorporating the name "Pete", is known to have been used as early as 1930 on the radio program Empire Builders. The episode of that program broadcast on December 29, 1930, featured a trio of singers dubbed "The Three Visiting Firemen: Pete, Re-Pete, and Three-Pete".

The Oxford English Dictionary credits an Illinois high school senior, Sharif Ford, with the earliest published use of the word in the March 8, 1989 edition of the St. Louis Post-Dispatch. Ford's quote uses the term in a sporting context and serves to provide a clear etymology as well:
The Lincoln High Tigers say they want to "three-peat". "You know, kind of like repeat, except doing it for the third time", senior Sharif Ford said.
However, Riles & Co., the corporate entity of National Basketball Association (NBA) coach Pat Riley, submitted in November 1988 a trademark application for the use of three-peat on shirts, jackets and hats. At the time, the phrase was being used by members and fans of the Los Angeles Lakers basketball team, of whom Riley was the head coach, regarding the Lakers' quest that season to obtain what would have been a third successive NBA championship. According to Riley, it was Laker player Byron Scott who coined the term in reference to the team's goal for that season.

In 1989, Riles & Co. successfully registered the trademark under U.S. Registration Number 1552980. The Lakers did not win a third consecutive NBA championship in 1989, but the Chicago Bulls did in 1993, and Riles & Co. collected royalties from sports apparel makers who licensed the phrase for use on merchandise commemorating that accomplishment.

Riles & Co. subsequently obtained additional registrations expanding the trademark to cover many other kinds of merchandise in addition to apparel. The company then went on to reap additional profits by again licensing the phrase to merchandisers when the Bulls again won three consecutive NBA championships from 1996 through 1998, as well as when the New York Yankees won three straight World Series championships from 1998 through 2000 and when the Lakers won three straight NBA championships from 2000 through 2002.

The trademark registration for three-peat has been challenged over the years by those who argue that the term has become too generic in its usage for the trademark to continue to be applicable. However, such arguments have yet to succeed, with the registration continuing to be upheld by the United States Patent and Trademark Office as recently as 2001, in the case of Christopher Wade v. Riles & Co.

In 2005, a group of individuals attempted to trademark the phrase Three-Pete in anticipation of the (ultimately unsuccessful) attempt that year by the University of Southern California (U.S.C.) football team to win a third consecutive national championship. The change in spelling was a reference to the team's head coach, Pete Carroll. However, the Patent Office ruled that the change in spelling was not dissimilar enough from Riles & Co.'s three-peat, and denied the registration. Later that year, U.S.C. fan Kyle Bunch began selling his own "Three-Pete" T-shirts. He discontinued sales once he was notified that he was infringing upon the Riles & Co. trademark.

As of late 2007, the trademark "Three Peat" is still active for shirts, jackets, caps, etc., and for commemorative mugs, plates, etc., and also for posters, bumper sticker, etc. The similar "3 Peat" became a registered trademark of Riles & Co. for blankets and other bedding, as of June 2015. Some of the Riles & Co. trademarks are no longer in effect, e.g. keychains.

Occurrences of three-peats
There have been numerous instances of teams winning three or more consecutive championships in the National Basketball Association, National Hockey League, Major League Baseball, National Football League, and Australian Football League, most of which occurred prior to the advent of the term three-peat.

North America: professional sports

All-America Football Conference
1946–1949   Cleveland Browns  (4)    (also won 1950 NFL title)

Continental Basketball Association
1985–1987   Tampa Bay/Rapid City Thrillers

Formula Drift

2017–2019   James Deane

Major Indoor Soccer League

1979–1982   New York Arrows  (4)
1988–1992   San Diego Sockers  (5)

Major League Baseball (World Series)
1936–1939   New York Yankees  (4)
1949–1953   New York Yankees  (5)
1972–1974   Oakland Athletics
1998–2000   New York Yankees

National Basketball Association (NBA Finals)
1952–1954   Minneapolis Lakers
1959–1966   Boston Celtics (8)
1991–1993   Chicago Bulls
1996–1998   Chicago Bulls
2000–2002   Los Angeles Lakers

National Football League (NFL champions)
1929–1931   Green Bay Packers (no post-season, title game began in 1933)
1965–1967   Green Bay Packers NFL Champions 1965–1967 (Won 1966 & 1967 NFL-AFL Championship Games (Super Bowl I and II))

National Hockey League (Stanley Cup Finals)
1947–1949   Toronto Maple Leafs
1956–1960   Montreal Canadiens (5)
1962–1964   Toronto Maple Leafs
1976–1979   Montreal Canadiens  (4)
1980–1983   New York Islanders  (4)

Premier Hockey Federation (Isobel Cup Finals)

2020–2022   Boston Pride (2020 co-champions with Minnesota Whitecaps)

Women's National Basketball Association (WNBA Finals)

 1997–2000   Houston Comets  (4)

North America: collegiate sports
NACDA Director's Cup (overall collegiate athletics)
1995–2013 Stanford (NCAA Division I)
1997–2001 Simon Fraser (NAIA)
1999–2011 Williams (NCAA Division III)
2000–2003 UC Davis (NCAA Division II)
2004–2011 Grand Valley State (NCAA Division II)
2005–2011 Azusa Pacific (NAIA)

NAIA National Football Championship
2002–2005 Carroll College Fighting Saints
NAIA National Basketball Championship

•  1957–1959 Tennessee State Tigers basketball

• 1970–1972 Kentucky State Thorobreds

NCAA Division I Baseball
1970–1974 USC

NCAA Division I Football

Football Bowl Subdivision (FBS)
1934–1936 Minnesota (Toledo Cup)
1944–1946 Army West Point
Football Championship Subdivision (FCS)
2005–2007 Appalachian State University
2011–2015 North Dakota State University  (5)
2017–2019 North Dakota State University

NCAA Division I Men's Basketball
1967–1973 UCLA  (7)
NCAA Division II Men's Basketball

 Northwest Missouri State University

NCAA Division I Men's Water Polo
2008–2013 USC

NCAA Division I Women's Basketball
1996–1998 Tennessee
2002–2004 Connecticut
2013–2016 Connecticut  (4)
NCAA Division I Men's Cross Country

 1944–1946 Drake
 1966–1968 Villanova
 1978–1981 UTEP (4)
 1990–1993 Arkansas (4)
 1998–2000 Arkansas
 2016–2018 Northern Arizona

NCAA Division II Women's Basketball
 1993–1996 North Dakota State Bison  (4)
 1997–1999 North Dakota Fighting Sioux
NCAA Division III Women's Basketball
 1998–2001 Washington  (4)

NCAA Division I Women's Soccer
1982–1984 North Carolina
1986–1994 North Carolina  (9)

NCAA Division II Football Championship
1993–1995 North Alabama

NCAA Division III Football
1983–1986 Augustana College (Illinois)
1996–1998 Mount Union
2000–2002 Mount Union
2009–2011 Wisconsin–Whitewater Warhawks

U.S. National Collegiate Club Rugby championships
1980–1983 California
1991–2002 California
2004–2008 California
2012–2014 BYU
U.S. Collegiate Ultimate Frisbee Championships

 1988–1990 UC Santa Barbara
 1996–1998 UC Santa Barbara

United States: tabletop games 
Warhammer 40k American Team Championships
 Team Happy 2015–2017

United States: marching arts 

The Cadets Drum and Bugle Corps won the Drum Corps International World Championship in 1983–1985.
The Cavaliers Drum and Bugle Corps three-peated 2000-2002 (2001 was a tie with the Cadets).

Other countries

Argentina
First Division (association football)
1949–1951 Racing Club
1955–1957 River Plate
Metro 1979–Metro 1980  River Plate
Apertura 1996–Apertura 1997 River Plate

Australia
Victorian Football League/Australian Football League
1906–1908 Carlton
1927–1930 Collingwood (four-peat)
1939–1941 Melbourne
1955–1957 Melbourne
2001–2003 Brisbane Lions
2013–2015 Hawthorn

Australian Ice Hockey League
2010–2012 Melbourne Ice

New South Wales Rugby Football League/Australian Rugby League/National Rugby League
1911–1913 Eastern Suburbs
1915–1917 Balmain
1925–1929 South Sydney
1935–1937 Eastern Suburbs
1953–1955 South Sydney
1956–1966 (eleven-peat) St. George
1981–1983 Parramatta Eels

West Australian Football League
1908–1911 East Fremantle
1919–1923 East Perth
1928–1931 East Fremantle
1938–1940 Claremont
1952–1954 South Fremantle
1961–1963 Swan Districts
1966–1968 Perth
1982–1984 Swan Districts
2000–2002 East Perth
2006–2008 Subiaco

Cricket

 2016–2019 Pymble Pigs (NCU NSW)
2016–2018 Sandgate-Redcliffe Gators (T20 QLD)

Belgium
Belgian Pro League
1900–1903 Racing de Bruxelles
1904–1907 R Union Saint-Gilloise
1924–1926 Beerschot
1933–1935 R Union Saint-Gilloise SR
1949–1951 RSC Anderlechtois
1954–1956 RSC Anderlechtois
1964–1968 RSC Anderlechtois
1969–1971 R Standard Liège
1976–1978 Club Brugge
1985–1987 Anderlecht
1993–1995 Anderlecht
2012–2014 Anderlecht
2020–2022 Club Brugge

Brazil
Brazilian Championship
2006–2008 São Paulo FC

Bulgaria
Bulgarian A PFG
1993–1995 Levski Sofia
2000–2002 Levski Sofia

Canada
Canadian Football League (Grey Cup):
1909–1911 Toronto Varsity Blues
1922–1924 Queen's University
1945–1947 Toronto Argonauts
1954–1956 Edmonton Eskimos
1978–1982 Edmonton Eskimos
Collegiate women's basketball
 2011–2015 Windsor Lancers (five-peat)

Chile
First Division (Association football):
1933–1935 Magallanes
1989–1991 Colo-Colo
Apertura 2006–Apertura 2007 Colo-Colo (four-peat)
Apertura 2011–Apertura 2012 Universidad de Chile
2018–2021 Club Deportivo Universidad Católica (four-peat)

Costa Rica
Costa Rica, American Football 1st Division:
2010–2012 Santa Ana Bulldogs

Czech Republic
Czech National Basketball League:
2004–2022 ERA Nymburk (19-peat)

Denmark
Danish Superliga
2009–2011 Copenhagen

Finland
Veikkausliiga
1998–2000 Haka
2009–2014 HJK (six-peat)

France
Ligue 1
1902–1904 Roubaix
1967–1970 Saint-Étienne
1974–1976 Saint-Étienne
1989–1992 Marseille (four-peat)
2002–2008 Lyon (seven-peat)
2013–2016 Paris Saint-Germain (four-peat)
2017–2020 Paris Saint-Germain

Germany
Bundesliga
1972–1974 Bayern Munich
1975–1977 Borussia Mönchengladbach
1985–1987 Bayern Munich
1999–2001 Bayern Munich
2013–2022 Bayern Munich (ten-peat)

DDR-Oberliga
1976–1978 SG Dynamo Dresden
1979–1988 Berliner FC Dynamo

Italy
Italian Football Championship
1898–1900 Genoa
1902–1904 Genoa
1911–1913 Pro Vercelli

Serie A
1931–1935 Juventus (five-peat)
1943, 1946–1949 Torino (five-peat)
1992–1994 Milan
2006–2010 Internazionale (five-peat)
2012–2020 Juventus (nine-peat)

Japan
Nippon Professional Baseball
1951–1953 Yomiuri Giants
1956–1958 Nishitetsu Lions (changed to Seibu Lions)
1965–1973 Yomiuri Giants (nine-peat)
1975–1977 Hankyu Braves (changed to Orix Buffaloes)
1986–1988 Seibu Lions (changed to Saitama Seibu Lions)
1990–1992 Seibu Lions (changed to Saitama Seibu Lions)
2017–2020 Fukuoka SoftBank Hawks (four-peat)

J1 League
2007–2009 Kashima Antlers

Netherlands
Eredivisie
1897–1899 RAP Amsterdam
1900–1903 HVV (four-peat)
1911–1913 Sparta
1966–1968 Ajax
1986–1989 PSV (four-peat)
1994–1996 Ajax
2005–2008 PSV (four-peat)
2011–2014 Ajax (four-peat)

Norway
Tippeligaen
1972–1975 Viking (four-peat)
1992–2004 Rosenborg (thirteen-peat)

Portugal
Primeira Liga
1936–1938 Benfica
1947–1949 Sporting CP
1951–1954 Sporting CP (four-peat)
1963–1965 Benfica
1967–1969 Benfica
1971–1973 Benfica
1975–1977 Benfica
1995–1999 Porto (five-peat)
2006–2009 Porto (four-peat)
2011–2013 Porto
2014–2017 Benfica (four-peat)

Puerto Rico
Baseball
 1941/42–1944/45 Ponce (4)
 1996/97–1998/99 Indios de Mayaguez (3)

Spain
La Liga
1961–1965 Real Madrid (5)
1967–1969 Real Madrid
1978–1980 Real Madrid
1986–1990 Real Madrid (5)
1991–1994 Barcelona (4)
2009–2011 Barcelona

Liga ASOBAL
1956–1961 BM Granollers (6)
1962–1965 Atlético Madrid BM (4)
1966–1968 BM Granollers
1970–1972 BM Granollers
1975–1978 CB Alicante (4)
1983–1985 Atlético Madrid BM
1988–1992 FC Barcelona Handbol (5)
1995–2000 FC Barcelona Handbol (5)
2007–2010 BM Ciudad Real (4)
2011–2022 FC Barcelona Handbol (12)

South Korea
K League 1
1993–1995 Ilhwa Chunma (changed to Seongnam Ilhwa Chunma)
2001–2003 Seongnam Ilhwa Chunma (changed to Seongnam FC)
2017–2021 Jeonbuk Hyundai Motors (five-peat)

KBO League
1986–1989 Haitai Tigers (changed to Kia Tigers) (four-peat)
2011–2014 Samsung Lions (four-peat)

V-League
2008–2014 Daejeon Samsung Fire Bluefangs (seven-peat)

Sweden
Allsvenskan
1945–1948 IFK Norrköping
1949–1951 Malmö FF
1985–1989 Malmö FF
1993–1996 IFK Göteborg

Turkey

Süper Lig
1971–1973 Galatasaray
1979–1981 Trabzonspor
1990–1992 Beşiktaş
1997–2000 Galatasaray (four-peat)

United Kingdom
Super League Super League Grand Final
2007–2009 Leeds Rhinos

English rugby union
1991–1994 Bath
1999–2001 Leicester Tigers
2003–2005 London Wasps

English football first tier

1924–1926 Huddersfield Town
1933–1935 Arsenal
1982–1984 Liverpool
1999–2001 Manchester United
2007–2009 Manchester United

Scottish Premier League
1965–1974 Celtic F.C  (nine-peat)
1989–1997 Rangers F.C  (nine-peat)
2012–2020 Celtic (nine-peat)

USSR
Soviet Top League
1946–1948 CSKA Moscow
1966–1968 Dynamo Kyiv

Yugoslavia
Yugoslav First League
1933, 1935–36 BSK Beograd
1961–1963 Partizan
1968–1970 Crvena Zvezda
1990–1992 Crvena Zvezda

International

Summer Olympics

Fencing
2012, 2016, 2021  Áron Szilágyi, individual men's sabre
Swimming

 1956, 1960, 1964  Dawn Fraser, Women's 100 metres freestyle
 1988, 1992, 1996  Krisztina Egerszegi, Women's 200 metres backstroke
 2004, 2008, 2012, 2016  Michael Phelps, Men's 200-metre individual medley (four-peat)
 2012, 2016, 2021  Katie Ledecky, Women's 800 metres freestyle

World Chess Championships 
Unofficial Championships (before 1886)

 1866–1876  Wilhelm Steinitz (three-peat)

Pre-FIDE World Championships (1886–1946)

 1886–1892 / Wilhelm Steinitz (four-peat)
 1894–1910  Emanuel Lasker (six-peat)
 1927–1934 Alexander Alekhine (three-peat)
 1948–1954  Mikhail Botvinnik (three-peat)
 1975–1981  Anatoly Karpov (three-peat)
 1985–1995 / Garry Kasparov (six-peat)
 1993–1998  Anatoly Karpov (three-peat)

FIDE World Championships (2006–present)

 2007–2012  Viswanathan Anand (four-peat)
 2013–2021  Magnus Carlsen (five-peat)

Association Football 
UEFA Champions League
1956–1960  Real Madrid (five-peat)
1971–1973  Ajax
1974–1976  Bayern Munich
2016–2018  Real Madrid
UEFA Europa League
2014–2016  Sevilla

CONCACAF Champions League
2011–2013  Monterrey

South American football Copa Libertadores
1968–1970  Estudiantes de La Plata
1972–1975  Independiente (four-peat)

CONMEBOL's Copa América

1945–1947  Argentina

Champ Car World Series auto racing
2004–2007 Sébastien Bourdais

CONCACAF U.S. Open Cup
1965–1967 Greek American Atlas
2009–2011 Seattle Sounders FC

International rules football 
 1990–1999 (1990, 1998, 1999; note: international rules football games are held sporadically, hence the eight-year gap) Ireland

Cricket 
Indian cricket's Ranji Trophy
1958–1972 Bombay
1974–1976 Bombay

Cricket World Cup
1999–2007  Australia (World Cup every 4 years)

Formula One 
Formula One Champion
 1954–1957  Juan Manuel Fangio (four-peat)
 2000–2004  Michael Schumacher (five-peat)
 2010–2013  Sebastian Vettel (four-peat)
2017–2020  Lewis Hamilton (four-peat)

Winter X Games 
Winter X Games SuperPipe
2008–2013 Shaun White

Tennis

Davis Cup
1903–1906  British Isles
1907–1911 
1920–1926  United States
1927–1932 
1933–1936  Great Britain
1946–1949  United States
1950–1953  Australia
1955–1957  Australia
1959–1962  Australia
1964–1967  Australia
1968–1972

Fed Cup
1976–1982 
1983–1985  Czechoslovakia
1993–1995  Spain

Australian Open

Men's singles
1931–1933  Jack Crawford
1963–1967  Roy Emerson
2011–2013  Novak Djokovic
2019–2021  Novak Djokovic

Women's singles
1928–1930  Daphne Akhurst Cozens
1946–1948  Nancye Wynne Bolton
1960–1966  Margaret Court (six-peat)
1969–1971  Margaret Court
1974–1976  Evonne Goolagong Cawley
1988–1990  Steffi Graf
1991–1993   Monica Seles
1997–1999  Martina Hingis

Men's doubles
1936–1940  Adrian Quist (five-peat; his partners were  Don Turnbull in 1936–37 tournaments, and  John Bromwich until 1940)
1938–1940  John Bromwich (his partner was  Adrian Quist, see above)
1946–1950  John Bromwich and  Adrian Quist (five-peat)
1959–1961  Rod Laver and  Bob Mark
2009–2011  Mike Bryan and  Bob Bryan

Women's doubles
1923–1925  Sylvia Lance Harper (her partners were  Esna Boyd Robertson in the 1923 tournament, and  Daphne Akhurst Cozens in 1924–25)
1936–1940  Thelma Coyne Long and  Nancye Wynne Bolton
1947–1949  Thelma Coyne Long and  Nancye Wynne Bolton
1954–1956  Mary Bevis Hawton (her partners were  Beryl Penrose in 1954–55, and Thelma Coyne Long in the 1956 tournament)
1961–1963  Margaret Court (her partners were  Mary Carter Reitano in the 1961 tournament, and  Robyn Ebbern in 1962–63)
1969–1971  Margaret Court (her partners were  Judy Tegart Dalton in 1969–70, and  Evonne Goolagong Cawley in the 1971 tournament)
1974–1976  Evonne Goolagong Cawley (her partners were  Peggy Michel in 1974–75, and  Helen Gourlay in the 1976 tournament)
1976–12/1977  Helen Gourlay (her partners were  Evonne Goolagong Cawley in 1976 and December 1977 (see above), and  Dianne Fromholtz Balestrat in January 1977)
1982–1989  Martina Navratilova and  Pam Shriver (seven-peat)
1997–1999  Martina Hingis (her partners were  Natasha Zvereva in the 1997 tournament,  Mirjana Lučić in 1998, and  Anna Kournikova in 1999)

French Open

Men's singles
1894–1896  André Vacherot
1897–1900  Paul Aymé
1907–1909  Max Decugis
1912–1914  Max Decugis
1978–1981  Björn Borg (four-peat)
2005–2008  Rafael Nadal (four-peat)
2010–2014  Rafael Nadal (five-peat)
2017–2020  Rafael Nadal (four-peat)

Women's singles
1897–1899  Adine Masson
1904–1906  Kate Gillou
1909–1912  Jeanne Matthey
1920–1923  Suzanne Lenglen
1928–1930  Helen Wills
1935–1937  Hilde Krahwinkel Sperling
1990–1992   Monica Seles
2005–2007  Justine Henin

Men's doubles
1961–1965  Roy Emerson (six-peat: his partners were  Neal Fraser in 1960 and 1962,  Rod Laver in the 1961 tournament,  Manuel Santana in 1963,  Ken Fletcher in 1964, and  Fred Stolle in 1965)

Women's doubles
1909–1912  Jeanne Matthey and  Daisy Speranza
1920–1923  Suzanne Lenglen (four-peat: her partners were  Elisabeth d'Aryen in the 1920 tournament,  Geramine Pigueron in 1921–22, and  Didi Vasto in 1923)
1932–1934  Elizabeth Ryan (her partners were  Helen Wills in the 1932 tournament, and  Simonne Mathieu in 1933–34)
1936–1939  Simonne Mathieu (four-peat: her partners were  Billie Yorke in 1936–38, and  Jadwiga Jędrzejowska in the 1939 tournament)
1936–1938  Billie Yorke (her partner was  Simonne Mathieu, see above)
1950–1953  Doris Hart and  Shirley Fry Irvin
1961–1963  Renée Schuurman (her partners were  Sandra Reynolds in 1961–62, and  Ann Jones in the 1963 tournament)
1964–1966  Margaret Court (her partners were  Lesley Turner Bowrey in 1964–65, and  Judy Tegart in the 1966 tournament)
1967–1971  Françoise Dürr (five-peat: her partners were  Gail Chanfreau in 1967 and 1970–71, and  Ann Jones in 1967–68)
1984–1988  Martina Navratilova (five-peat: her partners were  Pam Shriver in 1984–85 and 1987–88, and  Andrea Temesvári in the 1986 tournament)
1991–1995  Gigi Fernández (five-peat: her partners were  Jana Novotná in the 1991 tournament, and   Natasha Zvereva in 1992–95)
1992–1995   Natasha Zvereva (four-peat: her partner was  Gigi Fernández, see above)

Wimbledon

Gentlemen's singles
1881–1886  William Renshaw
1897–1900  Reginald Doherty
1902–1906  Laurence Doherty
1910–1913  Anthony Wilding
1934–1936  Fred Perry
1976–1980  Björn Borg (five-peat)
1993–1995  Pete Sampras
1997–2000  Pete Sampras (four-peat)
2003–2007  Roger Federer (five-peat)
2018–2021  Novak Djokovic (2020 Wimbledon was cancelled due to COVID-19)

Ladies' singles
1891–1893  Lottie Dod
1919–1923  Suzanne Lenglen
1927–1930  Helen Wills
1948–1950  Louise Brough
1952–1954  Maureen Connolly
1966–1968  Billie Jean King
1982–1987  Martina Navratilova (six-peat)
1991–1993  Steffi Graf

Gentlemen's doubles
1884–1886  William Renshaw and  Ernest Renshaw
1894–1896  Wilfred Baddeley and  Herbert Baddeley
1897–1901  Laurence Doherty and  Reginald Doherty
1903–1905  Laurence Doherty and  Reginald Doherty
1921–22  Randolph Lycett (his partners were  Max Woosnam in the 1921 tournament,  James Anderson in 1922, and  Leslie Godfree)
1929–1931  John Van Ryn (his partners were  Wilmer Allison in 1929–30, and  George Lott in the 1931 tournament)
1968–1970  John Newcombe and  Tony Roche
1993–1997  Todd Woodbridge and  Mark Woodforde
2002–2004  Todd Woodbridge and  Jonas Björkman

Ladies' doubles
1919–1923  Suzanne Lenglen and  Elizabeth Ryan (five-peat)
1925–1927  Elizabeth Ryan (her partners were  Suzanne Lenglen in the 1925 tournament,  Mary Browne in 1926, and  Helen Wills in 1927)
1948–1950  Louise Brough and  Margaret Osborne duPont
1951–1953  Shirley Fry Irvin and  Doris Hart
1956–1958  Althea Gibson (her partners were  Angela Buxton in the 1956 tournament,  Darlene Hard in 1957, and  Maria Bueno in 1958)
1970–1973  Billie Jean King (four-peat: her partners were  Rosemary Casals in 1970–71 and 1973, and  Betty Stöve in the 1972 tournament)
1981–1984  Martina Navratilova and  Pam Shriver (four-peat)
1991–1994   Natasha Zvereva (four-peat: her partners were  Larisa Neiland in the 1991 tournament, and  Gigi Fernández in 1992–94)
1992–1994  Gigi Fernández (her partner was  Natasha Zvereva, see above)

US Open

Men's singles
1881–1887  Richard Sears
1890–1892   Oliver Campbell
1898–1900  Malcolm Whitman
1907–1911   William Larned
1920–1925  Bill Tilden
1979–1981  John McEnroe
1985–1987  Ivan Lendl
2004–2008  Roger Federer (five-peat)

Women's singles
1909–1911  Hazel Hotchkiss Wightman
1912–1914   Mary Browne
1915–1918  Molla Mallory
1920–1922  Molla Mallory
1923–1925  Helen Wills
1927–1929  Helen Wills
1932–1935  Helen Jacobs
1938–1940  Alice Marble
1943–1944  Pauline Betz
1948–1950  Margaret Osborne duPont
1951–1953  Maureen Connolly
1975–1978  Chris Evert (four-peat)
2012–2014  Serena Williams

Men's doubles
1882–1887  Richard Sears (six-peat: his partners were  James Dwight in 1882–84 and 1886–87, and  Joseph Clark in the 1885 tournament)
1882–1884  James Dwight (his partner was  Richard Sears, see above)
1899–1901  Holcombe Ward and  Dwight F. Davis
1904–1906  Holcombe Ward and  Beals Wright
1907–1910   Fred Alexander and   Harold Hackett (four-peat)
1912–1914  Maurice McLoughlin and  Tom Bundy
1921–1923  Bill Tilden (his partners were  Vincent Richards in 1921–22, and  Brian Norton in the 1923 tournament)
1928–1930  George Lott  (his partners were  John F. Hennessey in the 1928 tournament, and  John Doeg in 1929–30)

Women's doubles
1894–1898   Juliette Atkinson (five-peat: her partners were  Helen Hellwig in 1894–95,  Elisabeth Moore in the 1896 tournament, and Kathleen Atkinson in 1897-98)
1909–1911  Hazel Hotchkiss Wightman (her partners were  Edith Rotch in 1909–10, and Eleonora Sears in the 1911 tournament)
1912–1914   Mary K. Browne (her partners were  Dorothy Green in the 1912 tournament, and  Louise Riddell Williams in 1913–14)
1915–1917  Eleonora Sears (her partners were  Hazel Hotchkiss Wightman in the 1915 tournament, and  Molla Mallory in 1916–17)
1918–1920  Marion Jessup and  Eleanor Goss
1937–1941  Sarah Palfrey Cooke (five-peat: her partners were  Alice Marble in 1937–40, and  Margaret Osborne duPont in the 1941 tournament)
1937–1940  Alice Marble (four-peat: her partner was  Sarah Palfrey Cooke, see above)
1941–1950  Margaret Osborne duPont (ten-peat: her partners were  Sarah Palfrey Cooke in the 1941 tournament (see above), and  Louise Brough in 1942–50)
1942–1950  Louise Brough (nine-peat: her partner was Margaret Osborne duPont, see above)
1951–1954  Shirley Fry Irvin and  Doris Hart
1955–1957  Louise Brough and  Margaret Osborne duPont
1958–1962    Darlene Hard (five-peat: her partners were   Jeanne Arth in 1958–59,  Maria Bueno in 1960 and 1962, and  Lesley Turner Bowrey in the 1961 tournament)
2002–2004  Virginia Ruano Pascual and  Paola Suárez

ATP World Tour Finals

Singles

1971–1973  Ilie Năstase
1985–1987  Ivan Lendl
2012–2015  Novak Djokovic (four-peat)

Doubles

1978–1984  Peter Fleming and John McEnroe (seven-peat)

WTA Finals

Singles

1983–1986  Martina Navratilova (four-peat)
1990–1992   Monica Seles
2012–2014  Serena Williams

Indian Wells Masters

Men's singles

2004–2006  Roger Federer
2014–2016  Novak Djokovic

Men's doubles

1986–1988  Guy Forget (his partners were  Peter Fleming in the 1986 tournament,  Yannick Noah in 1987, and  Boris Becker in 1988)
1988–1990  Boris Becker (his partners were  Guy Forget in 1988 and 1990, and  Jakob Hlasek in the 1989 tournament)

Miami Open

Men's singles

2001–2003  Andre Agassi
2014–2016  Novak Djokovic

Women's singles

1994–1996  Steffi Graf
2002–2004  Serena Williams
2013–2015  Serena Williams

Men's doubles

1996–1998  Todd Woodbridge and  Mark Woodforde
2010–2012  Leander Paes (his partners were  Lukáš Dlouhý in the 2010 tournament,  Mahesh Bhupathi in 2011, and  Radek Štěpánek in 2012)

Women's doubles

1995–1997  Arantxa Sánchez Vicario (her partners were  Jana Novotná in 1995 and 1996, and  Natasha Zvereva in the 1997 tournament)

Monte Carlo Masters

Men's singles

2005–2012  Rafael Nadal (eight-peat)
2016–2018  Rafael Nadal

Italian Open

Men's singles

2005–2007  Rafael Nadal

Paris Masters

Men's singles

2013–2015  Novak Djokovic

Barcelona Open

Men's singles

2005–2009  Rafael Nadal (five-peat)
2011–2013  Rafael Nadal
2016–2018  Rafael Nadal

Golf

US Open
1903–1905  Willie Anderson

The Open Championship
1868–1872  Young Tom Morris (four-peat)
1877–1879  Jamie Anderson
1880–1882  Bob Ferguson
1954–1956  Peter Thomson

PGA Championship
1924–1927  Walter Hagen

Basketball

Argentina
Liga Nacional de Básquet
2010–2012 Club Atlético Peñarol (Mar del Plata)
2015–2018 San Lorenzo de Almagro (basketball) (four-peat)

France
LNB Pro A
1983–1985 Limoges CSP
1988–1990 Limoges CSP
2019–2022 LDLC Asvel

Germany
Basketball Bundesliga
1970–1972 TuS 04 Leverkusen
1990–1996 TSV Bayer 04 Leverkusen
1997–2003 ALBA Berlin (seven-peat)
2010–2013 Brose Baskets (four-peat, also won the German Cup in 2010, 2011 and 2012)
2020–2022 ALBA Berlin

Israel
Israeli Basketball Premier League
1957–1959 Maccabi Tel Aviv
1962–1964 Maccabi Tel Aviv
1970–1992 Maccabi Tel Aviv (twenty three-peat)
1994–2007 Maccabi Tel Aviv (fourteen-peat)
2018–2021 Maccabi Tel Aviv (four-peat)

Italy
Lega Basket Serie A
1946–1949 Virtus Bologna (four-peat)
1950–1954 Olimpia Milano (five-peat)
1957–1960 Olimpia Milano (four-peat)
1965–1967 Olimpia Milano
1969–1971 Varese
1985–1987 Olimpia Milano
2007–2011 Mens Sana Siena

Philippines
PBA
 1976–1977 Crispa Redmanizers (six straight championships: 1975 All-Philippine Championship, 1976 Grand Slam, 1977 All-Filipino Conference and 1977 Open Conference)
 1983–1984 Crispa Redmanizers (four straight championships: 1983 Grand Slam, 1984 First All-Filipino Conference)
1984–1985 Great Taste Coffee Makers (four straight championships: 1984 Second All-Filipino Conference, 1984 Invitational Championship, 1985 Open Conference, 1985 All-Filipino Conference)
 1988–1989 San Miguel Beermen (four straight championships: 1988 PBA Reinforced Conference, 1989 Grand Slam)
 1995–1996 Alaska Milkmen (four straight championship: 1995 Governors' Cup and 1996 Grand Slam)
 1997–1998 Alaska Milkmen (three straight championships: 1997 Governors' Cup, 1998 All-Filipino Cup and 1998 PBA Commissioner's Cup)
 2000–2001 San Miguel Beermen (three straight championships: 2000 Commissioner's Cup, 2000 Governors' Cup, 2001 All-Filipino Cup)
 2013–2014 San Mig Super Coffee Mixers (four straight championships: 2013 Governors' Cup, 2013–14 Grand Slam)

Puerto Rico
BSN basketball
1941–1943 Atléticos de San Germán
1947–1950 Atléticos de San Germán (4-peat)
1955–1957 Cardenales de Rio Piedras
1964–1966 Leones de Ponce
1971–1975 Vaqueros de Bayamon (5-peat)
1977–1979 Piratas de Quebradillas
1998–2001 Cangrejeros de Santurce (4-peat)

Spain
Liga ACB
1960–1966 Real Madrid Baloncesto (7-peat)
1968–1977 Real Madrid Baloncesto (10-peat)
1984–1986 Real Madrid Baloncesto
1987–1990 Barcelona (4-peat)
1995–1997 Barcelona

Switzerland
Swiss Basketball League
1997–1999 Fribourg
2000–2002 Lugano Tigers
2010–2012 Lugano Tigers
2018–2022 Fribourg (4-peat)

Turkey
Basketball Super League
1970–1973 İTÜ BK
1976–1978 Eczacıbaşı
1980–1982 Eczacıbaşı
1992–1994 Efes Pilsen
2001–2004 Efes Pilsen (four-peat)
2016–2018 Fenerbahçe

Vietnam
VBA
 2019–2022 Saigon Heat (three-peat: 2019, 2020, 2022)

The National Football League
In the National Football League (NFL), a Super Bowl championship three-peat has not been accomplished. Two-time defending Super Bowl champions who failed to three-peat include the Green Bay Packers (1968), Miami Dolphins (1974), Pittsburgh Steelers (twice: 1976, 1980), San Francisco 49ers (1990), Dallas Cowboys (1994), Denver Broncos (1999), and New England Patriots (2005).  All of these teams failed to return to the title game in the third season (indicated in parentheses).

The Buffalo Bills went to 4 consecutive Super Bowls as the AFC champions from 1990–1993, which is a feat unmatched in NFL history; however, they lost in every appearance.

The  New England Patriots are the most recent team to play in three consecutive Super Bowls (from 2016–2018), winning Super Bowl LI (2016) and Super Bowl LIII (2018), but losing Super Bowl LII (2017)

In the early years of the NFL, decades before the introduction of either the term three-peat or the Super Bowl, the Packers won three consecutive NFL titles from 1929–31.  This was achieved without playing any postseason playoff games, as the league title was determined at that time from the season standings.  In addition, the Packers won the NFL championship in 1965, at a time when the rival NFL and AFL played separate exclusive championships.  They then followed that 1965 championship with their first two Super Bowl victories in 1966 and 1967 (their Super Bowl berths were earned by winning both the 1966 NFL Championship Game and 1967 NFL Championship Game), thereby winning championships three years in a row.

Related terms
There have been efforts to come up with a similarly clever name for the potential fourth consecutive championship in the year following a three-peat. But attempts such as quat-row have thus far failed to catch on, and most fans simply use the term four-peat. Since the term three-peat came into usage, however, only one team in major American sports has been able to achieve it – Hendrick Racing/Jimmie Johnson NASCAR team, who won 5 championships in a row.

The wordplay of three-peat is clearer if repeat is stressed on the first syllable; this pronunciation is uncommon outside North America. Other English-speaking people may instead talk of a hat trick of championships, or simply a three-in-a-row.

There are also terms for winning three trophies in the same season:
Triple Crown – various sports
Treble (association football)
Grand slam – Philippine Basketball Association

References

Sports terminology
Sports accomplishments